The Corps Léger d'Intervention (CLI) (French for "light intervention corps") was a Pacific War interarm corps of the Far East French Expeditionary Forces commanded by Général de corps d'armée Roger Blaizot that used guerrilla warfare against the Imperial Japanese Army that had occupied French Indochina since 1941. It was created by General Charles de Gaulle in 1943 and modeled after the British Chindits Special Forces who fought in the Burma Campaign.

History

Creation
The CLI was created on November 4, 1943 in Jijel, Kabylie (French Algeria) with 500 volunteer commandos under Lieutenant-Colonel Paul Huard. Its purpose was to reinforce the resistance in Japanese occupied French Indochina. Local resistance was led by General Mordant (a.k.a. Narcisse) who came from mainland France in 1941.

SOE introduction
While the commandos trained in Jijel, Commandant de Crevècoeur arrived at Meerut, North West India on November 10, 1943 to introduce the CLI to British Special Operations Executive (SOE) Force 136's Colin Hercules Mackenzie. The first CLI trainees were sent to Poona (100 km from Bombay) for jungle warfare instruction under the British.

Composition
On March 15, 1944 the French Indochina guerrillas numbered 1,349 (993 locals and 356 Europeans) including 242 in Laos (195 locals and 47 Europeans).

Following Victory in Europe Day, 60 SOE Jedburgh members of the French intelligence agency DGER were transferred to Force 136's "French Indochina Country Section" (Section Indochine Française).

Training
Lieutenant-Colonel Albert Lacroix, Saint-Cyr 1930-32 Joseph Joffre promotion, was in charge of CLI recruitment and training as Chief of staff in French Algeria. He later returned to French Indochina leading Commando Léger N°1 ("light commando n.1") in operations.

Operations
Japanese coup d'état in French Indochina

See also
Operation Jedburgh
GCMA
Force 136

References

Bibliography
L'Indochine face au Japon: 1940-1945 : Decoux-de Gaulle, un malentendu fatal, by Philippe Grandjean, Editions L'Harmattan, 2004

External links
Général Paul Huard, Le Corps Léger d’intervention et l’Indochine
Avec le Corps Léger d'Intervention Aéroporté
PRESENTATION DU C.L.I
NOTES SUR LES SERVICES FRANÇAIS (1940-1945)

Army units and formations of France
Regiments of France
Military units and formations established in 1943
Military units and formations disestablished in 1946
Special forces of France
French Resistance networks and movements